"G.L.A.D" is a song by English singer-songwriter and actress Kim Appleby, released as the second single from her debut solo album, Kim Appleby. It was co-written by her with her sister, Melanie Appleby and Craig Logan. The remix features a rap from Aswad vocalist Brinsley Forde. It peaked at number ten on the UK Singles Chart for two weeks in February 1991. "G.L.A.D" also peaked at number five in Luxembourg, number six in Belgium, and number seven in Ireland.

Critical reception
A reviewer from Liverpool Echo called the song "cheerful and catchy." Pan-European magazine Music & Media commented, "The well-known PWL-vibe, sometimes known as 'the sound of a bright young Britain' strikes back. G.L.A.D. stands for Good Lovin And Devotion, and is taken from Appleby's solo debut album as the follow-up to Don't Worry. It's solid but not exactly profound." Newcastle Evening Chronicle described it as "bouncy bubbly pop", noting that Appleby co-wrote it with late sister Mel and ex Bros Craig Logan.

Music video
The music video for "G.L.A.D" was directed by British director, producer and writer of films and television series Nick Willing.

Track listings
 7-inch single
 "G.L.A.D" (7-inch remix) – 3:03
 "G.L.A.D" (instrumental) – 3:04

 12-inch single
 "G.L.A.D" (Harding/Curnow remix) – 6:50 
 "G.L.A.D" (Pete Schwier remix) – 6:15
 "G.L.A.D" (7-inch remix) – 3:03

 CD single
 "G.L.A.D" (7-inch remix) – 3:03 
 "G.L.A.D" (Harding/Curnow remix) – 6:50
 "G.L.A.D" (Pete Schwier remix) – 6:15

Charts

Weekly charts

Weekly charts

References

1990 songs
1991 singles
Kim Appleby songs
Parlophone singles
Songs written by Craig Logan